Mark Rankin is a music producer and engineer currently working in Los Angeles. He has 2 Grammy Awards for his work with Adele and multiple nominations with artists such as Queens Of The Stone Age, Iggy Pop, Weezer, Florence And The Machine and Foster The People.

Personal life
Rankin was born in England, now resided with family and kids in Los Angeles. He started his studio career in the London Exchange Mastering Studios, the first session was with electronic duo Basement Jaxx.

Awards and nominations
Rankin won The Music Producers Guild Award for Breakthrough Engineer of the Year in 2010.

In 2012, Rankin won two Grammy Awards: in the Album of the Year category with Adele's 21, and Record of the Year category with "Rolling in the Deep".

In 2014, he was nominated for The Music Producers Guild Award for Engineer of the Year. He also received two Grammy nominations for the Queens of the Stone Age album ...Like Clockwork, in categories Best Rock Album and Best Engineered Album, Non-Classical.

Engineering and mixing discography
Credits adapted from AllMusic.

 2005: Bloc Party – Silent Alarm
 2007: Kate Nash – Made of Bricks
 2008: Bloc Party – Intimacy
 2009: Florence and the Machine – Lungs
 2009: Led Bib – Sensible Shoes
 2009: Jack Peñate – Everything Is New
 2010: Plan B – The Defamation of Strickland Banks
 2010: CeeLo Green – The Lady Killer
 2011: Adele – 21
 2011: Foster the People – Torches
 2011: Florence and the Machine – Ceremonials
 2011: Adele – Live at the Royal Albert Hall
 2012: The Big Pink – Future This
 2012: The Invisible – Rispah
 2012: Tyler James – A Place I Go
 2013: Willy Moon – Here's Willy Moon
 2013: Queens of the Stone Age – ...Like Clockwork
 2013: AlunaGeorge – Body Music
 2013: Eliza Doolittle – In Your Hands
 2014: Bombay Bicycle Club – So Long, See You Tomorrow
 2014: Nina Nesbitt – Peroxide
 2014: The Hoosiers – The News from Nowhere
 2017: Queens of the Stone Age – Villains
 2018: Broods - Don't Feed the Pop Monster
 2019: Weezer - Weezer
 2019: Harry Styles - "Fine Line (Harry Styles album)"
 Unknown: 3LW - Got Me On Lock
 2020: Elliphant - "Had Enough"
2021: Jarryd James - "P.M."
2021: Elliphant - "Could This Be Love"
2021: Elliphant - "Rocking Horse"
2021: Delta Goodrem - "Bridge over Troubled Dreams"
2021: Noah Kahan - "Part of Me"
2021: Frank Carter & The Rattlesnakes - "My Town"
2022: Spoon – Lucifer on the Sofa

References

External links

British record producers
Grammy Award winners
Living people
Year of birth missing (living people)